In human anatomy, there are three types of chief cells, the gastric chief cell, the parathyroid chief cell, and the type 1 chief cells found in the carotid body.

Cell types
The gastric chief cell (also known as a zymogenic cell or peptic cell) is a cell in the stomach that releases pepsinogen and chymosin. Pepsinogen is activated into the digestive enzyme pepsin when it comes in contact with hydrochloric acid produced by gastric parietal cells. This type of cell also secretes gastric lipase enzymes, which help digest triglycerides into free fatty acids and di- and mono-glycerides. There is also evidence that the gastric chief cell secretes leptin in response to the presence of food in the stomach. Leptin has been found in the pepsinogen granules of chief cells.

Gastric pit cells are replaced every 2–4 days. This high rate of turnover is a protective mechanism designed to protect the epithelial lining of the stomach from both the proteolytic action of pepsin and the acid produced by parietal cells. Gastric chief cells are much longer lived and are believed to differentiate from stem cells located higher in the gastric unit in the isthmus.   These stem cells differentiate into mucous neck cells in the isthmus and transition into chief cells as they migrate towards the base. Since the mucus neck cells do not divide as it becomes a chief cell this process is known as transdifferentiation. The gene Mist1 has been shown to regulate mucus neck cell to chief cell transdifferentiation and plays a role in the normal development of the chief cell organelles and structures.

The parathyroid chief cell is the primary cell of the parathyroid gland. It produces and secretes parathyroid hormone in response to low calcium levels. PTH plays an important role in regulating blood calcium levels by raising the amount of calcium in the blood. Parathyroid tissue seems to have a low turn-over rate.

Histology
Gastric chief cells are epithelial cells which are found within the gastric unit or gastric gland, and form the base of the gastric unit. The gastric chief cell has an extensive network of lamellar rough endoplasmic reticulum organized around the nucleus. The gastric chief cell also contains many large secretory vesicles filled with digestive enzymes in the apical cytoplasm.

Parathyroid chief cells make up the majority of the parathyroid gland along with adipocytes and oxyphil cells. Parathyroid chief cells have large amounts of organelles associated with protein synthesis.  As in many endocrine organs, with age, more oxyphil cells appear in the parathyroid gland.

Diseases

In gastric tissue, a loss of parietal cells due to chronic inflammation has been shown to affect chief cell differentiation and can induce chief cells to transdifferentiate back into neck cells and can lead to the formation of mucus cell metaplasia known as spasmolytic polypeptide expressing metaplasia (SPEM) that could be precancerous. If parietal cells are lost, mature chief cells do not form. Parietal cells may secrete factors that lead to transdifferentiation of chief cells, so if lost, chief cells do not normally develop.

References

Cell biology